Richard Arthur Brabazon Ponsonby-Fane (8 January 1878 – 10 December 1937) was a British academic, author, specialist of Shinto and Japanologist.

Early years

Richard Arthur Brabazon Ponsonby was born at Gravesend on the south bank of the Thames in Kent, England to John Henry and Florence Ponsonby.  His boyhood was spent in the family home in London and at the Somerset country home, Brympton d'Evercy, of his grandfather, Spencer Ponsonby-Fane. Ponsonby was educated at Harrow School.

He added "Fane" to his own name when he inherited Brympton d'Evercy in 1916 after the deaths of both his grandfather and father.

Career
In 1896, Ponsonby traveled to Cape Town to serve as Private Secretary to the Governor of the British Cape Colony. For the next two decades, his career in the British Empire's colonial governments spanned the globe.  He worked closely with a number of colonial leaders as private secretary to the Governor of Natal (1896), to the Governor of Trinidad and Tobago (1898), to the Governor of Ceylon (1900), and to the Governor of Hong Kong (1903). He was re-posted to Natal in 1907; and in 1910, he was private secretary to the Governor of Fiji. Also in 1910 he played a single first-class cricket match for the Marylebone Cricket Club. In 1915–1919, he was re-posted as private secretary to the Governor of Hong Kong.

In addition to his government duties in Hong Kong, he began lecturing at the University of Hong Kong in 1916; and his association with the faculty of the university continued until 1926.

After 1919, Ponsonby-Fane became a permanent resident of Japan, traveling four months of the year to Hong Kong for lectures at the Crown colony's university.

In 1921, when the Japanese Crown Prince visited Hong Kong en route to Europe, Ponsonby-Fane was introduced as his interpreter.

When Emperor Shōwa was enthroned in 1928, he was the only non-Japanese guest who was invited to witness the ceremonies from in front of the palace's Kenreimon gate.
In 1930, when HIH Prince Takamatsu and his wife traveled to Europe, Ponsonby-Fane sailed on the same ship; and he was invited to attend all the welcoming receptions for them in England.

In 1932, Ponsonby-Fane built a Japanese-style home in one of the northern suburbs of Kyoto.  In the last decades of his life, he was always photographed with a long woolen scarf draped around his shoulders.  This unique scarf was said to be hand-knit by Dowager Empress Teimei, the widow of Emperor Taishō; and he highly valued this unique token of personal favour.

Ponsonby-Fane died at home in Kyoto in December 1937.

Selected works
In an overview of writings by and about Richard Ponsonby-Fane, OCLC/WorldCat lists roughly 74 works in 136 publications in 2 languages and 1,443 library holdings. 
This list is not finished; you can help Wikipedia by adding to it.
 The Imperial Family of Japan, 1915
 The Capital and Palace of Heian (Heian-kio oyobi Daidairi), 1924
 The Vicissitudes of Shinto, 1931
 The Nomenclature of the N. Y. K. Fleet, 1931
 Kamo Mioya Shrine, 1934
 Kyoto: the Old Capital of Japan, 794-1869, 1956
 The Imperial House of Japan, 1959
 Sovereign and Subject, 1962
 Studies in Shinto and Shrines, 1962
 The Vicissitudes of Shinto, 1963
 Visiting Famous Shrines in Japan, 1964

Honours
 Order of the Rising Sun.
 Order of the Sacred Treasure, 1921.
 University of Hong Kong, Honorary Doctor of Laws, 1926.

See also
 Private Secretary to the Sovereign

Notes

References
 Britton, Dorothy. (1997).  "Richard Ponsonby-Fane, A Modern William Adams," pp. 190-204 in  Britain and Japan: Biographical Portraits (Ian Nish, editor).  London: Routledge. 
 Fiévé, Nicolas. (2000).  Japanese Capitals in Historical Perspective: Place, Power and Memory in Kyoto, Edo and Tokyo. ; OCLC 45325157
 Ponsonby-Fane, Richard Arthur Brabazon. (1962). "A Biographical sketch of Dr. R. Ponsonby-Fane,"  Studies in Shinto and Shrines. Kyoto: Ponsonby Memorial Society. OCLC 399449

1878 births
1937 deaths
British Japanologists
British expatriates in Japan
Historians of Japan
People educated at Harrow School
Recipients of the Order of the Sacred Treasure, 4th class
English cricketers
Marylebone Cricket Club cricketers
Richard
Richard